Tradescantia ohiensis, commonly known as bluejacket or Ohio spiderwort, is an herbaceous plant species in the genus Tradescantia native to eastern and central North America.  It is the most common and widely distributed species of Tradescantia in the United States, where it can be found from Maine in the northeast, west to Minnesota, and south to Texas and Florida. It also has a very small distribution in Canada in extreme southern Ontario near Windsor.

Distinguishing features of the species include glaucous leaves and stems, leaves forming an acute angle with the stems, sepals with hairs lacking glands which are confined to the apex if present at all, and a relatively tall habit (up to about 115 cm). Typical habitats for the plant include roadsides, along railroads, and in fields and thickets. Less typically it can occur in woods, and sometimes along streams. As with many species in the genus, it often forms hybrids with related species where they co-occur. More specifically, at least nine different species are thought to be capable of forming hybrids with T. ohiensis.

Ohio spiderwort has edible flowers and shoots. Flowers and stems can be eaten raw, while the leaves can be cooked. Leaves of the plant are mucilaginous and can be used to soothe insect bites in a similar way to aloe vera.

References 

ohiensis
Flora of Eastern Canada
Plants described in 1814
Flora of the Northeastern United States
Flora of the North-Central United States
Flora of the South-Central United States
Flora of the Southeastern United States
Taxa named by Constantine Samuel Rafinesque